Victor Eric "V. J." Beachem Jr. (born January 15, 1995) is an American professional basketball who last played for the Windy City Bulls of the NBA G League. He played college basketball for the Notre Dame Fighting Irish.

College career
Beachem was a standout basketball player at New Haven, being selected as an Indiana All-Star and helped the Bulldogs to a 2013 sectional title. He signed with Notre Dame, where he posted averages of 5.9 points and 1.4 rebounds per game as a sophomore. Beachem averaged 12 points and 3.9 rebounds per game as a junior and shot 44.4 percent from three-point range. He led the team to the Sweet 16 for the second consecutive season and was named to the All-East Regional team. Following the conclusion of his junior season Beachem declared for the NBA Draft along with teammate Demetrius Jackson, however he pulled his name out before the deadline. Beachem's best season was as a senior, as he averaged 14.5 points and 4.1 rebounds per game and played solid wing defense. However Beachem had a poor showing in Notre Dame's two NCAA Tournament games, going 3-for-23 from the field and 1-for-12 from 3-point range.

Professional career
After going undrafted in the 2017 NBA Draft, Beachem was picked up by the Minnesota Timberwolves in the Summer League. On August 11, 2017, Beachem signed with the Los Angeles Lakers, but was waived by the Lakers on October 9, 2017. He subsequently signed with the South Bay Lakers and averaged 8.9 points per game.

Beachem was added to the opening night roster of the Wisconsin Herd on November 1, 2018. He was added to the opening night roster of the Windy City Bulls on November 7, 2019.

References

External links
 Notre Dame Fighting Irish bio
 ESPN profile
 Sports Reference

1995 births
Living people
American men's basketball players
Basketball players from Fort Wayne, Indiana
Forwards (basketball)
Notre Dame Fighting Irish men's basketball players
People from New Haven, Indiana
South Bay Lakers players
Windy City Bulls players
Wisconsin Herd players